Vibhishana is the younger brother of Ravana, the King of Lanka, in the ancient Indian epic Ramayana. Though a rakshasa himself, Vibhishana turned his back on Ravana, and defected to Rama's side, owing to his dharma. After Rama defeated Ravana, the former crowned Prince Vibhishana as the King of Lanka before returning to Ayodhya.

Ramayana

Prince Vibhishana is portrayed as a pious and pure of heart in the epic. After performing a penance to invoke a boon from Brahma, he begged the deity to always set his mind on the path to righteousness, and nothing more.

Vibhishana was the youngest son of the rakshasi Kaikesi and the sage Vishrava, who was himself a son of the sage Pulastya, one of the Prajapati. Vibhishana was the younger brother of the King of Lanka, Ravana, and also the sibling of Kumbakarna. Even though he was born as a rakshasa, he was pious and considered himself a Brahmin, since his father was a sage.

Due to Vibhishana's differences with Ravana, and because he was against the act of kidnapping Sita, he fled Lanka. His mother, Kaikesi, advised him to go and serve Rama, who was at that time assembling an army to defeat Ravana and to recover his wife. As a consequence, he divulged the secrets of Ravana's army and made sure Rama was victorious in the great battle. Rama accepted Vibhishana's fealty and anointed him the King of Lanka after Ravana's death. In some versions of the epic, he takes his slain brother's queen Mandodari as his second wife, though in others he merely seeks her blessings during his coronation.

In the Lanka war, Vibhishana's knowledge about the secrets of Lanka proved invaluable to Rama. Vibhishana freely divulged many secrets that became key to the success of Rama's attack, including revealing the secret path to the temple of Nikumbala, the family deity of the Pulastya clan. In the climactic battle between Rama and Ravana, when Rama was unable to kill Ravana, he revealed the secret of Ravana's invulnerability to Rama. He told Rama that Ravana has stored the nectar of immortality in his belly and it is necessary to dry it. With this knowledge, Rama was finally able to kill Ravana.

He had a daughter named Trijata.

When Rama was about to leave Ayodhya at the end of his reign, he assumed his true form of Vishnu, ordering Vibhishana to stay on earth and serve the people and guide them to the path of truth and dharma. Hence, Vibhishana is considered one of the eight immortals or Chiranjeevins. Vishnu also ordered Vibhishana to pray to the family deity of Sun Dynasty, Lord Ranganatha.

Characterisation 
In the Ramayana, Vibhishana's characterisation assists in demonstrating the practical implications of the concept of dharma. The epic stresses that neither Vibhishana or Kumbhakarna strayed from the path of dharma and that there is no single way out of a moral dilemma. The Ramayana teaches that Kumbhakarna adhered to the dharma of loyalty to his kin when his advice fails, while Vibhishana chose to oppose his kin when his advice failed.

Other legends

Vibhishana is attached with the legend of Srirangam Ranganathaswamy temple, considered the abode of Vishnu on earth and the primary temple of Vishnu on earth. During the coronation of Rama, the avatar of Vishnu, Vibhishana was presented the sacrosanct Sri Ranga Vimana. He was carrying it all the way to his kingdom of Sri Lanka and midway, to rest, he placed the image on the banks of Kaveri. After performing his routine pooja, he tried to lift the Vimana, but it could not be lifted. Mahavishnu appeared to him and said that he desired to stay as Ranganatha in the place, which went on to become Srirangam. Vishnu also desired to watch the Brahmotsavam at Tirucherai. The festivals of the temple are thus considered sacred.

In some period of history Sinhalese people have considered Vibhishana as one of the Sathara Waram Deviyo (four guardian deities). This belief was more prominent in the Kotte period. According to the Ravana Katha of Wickramasinghe Adigar, after the defeat of Ravana, Vibhishana transferred the Yaksha capital from Alaka mandawa to Kelaniya. In the 15th-century poem of Thotagamuwe Sri Rahula Thera, the sælalihini sandesaya, Myna is ordered to carry the missive to Vibhishana at his temple in Kelaniya. After the 16th century, he was replaced as a God of the four warrants by the goddess Pattini. He continues to be worshipped by a diminishing number of adherents, mainly in the Kelaniya area.

References

Rakshasa in the Ramayana
Chiranjivins
Characters in the Ramayana
Sinhalese Buddhist deities